The Hong Kong International Wine & Spirits Fair is a trade fair organized by the Hong Kong Trade Development Council (HKTDC), scheduled to be held annually with its inaugural event held in 2008 at the central location in Hong Kong of the Hong Kong Convention and Exhibition Centre.

The next fair is in 2012 HKTDC Hong Kong International Wine & Spirits Fair 2012 8–10 November at the Hong Kong Convention and Exhibition Centre

Overview 
The 2009 fair attracted over 520 exhibitors from 34 countries and regions, including Argentina, Australia, Chile, the Chinese mainland, Hungary, India, Italy, Japan, Korea, Moldova, New Zealand, Portugal, Slovenia, South Africa, Spain, Thailand, the United States and Uruguay.

Following the removal of wine duty in 2008, Hong Kong became the only major economy in the world to impose no duty and no sales tax on wine. Hong Kong is ideally placed to host this major international wine event and it gives direct access to the expanding markets of the Chinese mainland and the rest of Asia.

The fair offers more than 50 special activities, including wine auctions, wine-tasting sessions, master classes and seminars. It opens to the public on the last day.

Major exhibit categories
Liquor & Beverage Products
Wine Production & Logistics
Wine Accessories & Equipment
Other related services

References

External links

Festivals established in 2008
Trade fairs in Hong Kong
Wine-related events
2008 establishments in Hong Kong
Food and drink festivals in China
Wine festivals
Food and drink festivals in Hong Kong